In enzymology, a trimethylamine dehydrogenase is an enzyme that catalyzes the chemical reaction

trimethylamine + H2O + electron-transferring flavoprotein  dimethylamine + formaldehyde + reduced electron-transferring flavoprotein

The 3 substrates of this enzyme are trimethylamine, H2O, and electron-transferring flavoprotein, whereas its 3 products are dimethylamine, formaldehyde, and reduced electron-transferring flavoprotein.

This enzyme belongs to the family of oxidoreductases, specifically those acting on the CH-NH group of donors with a flavin as acceptor.  The systematic name of this enzyme class is trimethylamine:electron-transferring flavoprotein oxidoreductase (demethylating). This enzyme participates in methane metabolism.

References

 
 
 
 
 

EC 1.5.8
Enzymes of unknown structure